WMCI 101.3 FM is a radio station broadcasting a country music format. Licensed to Mattoon, Illinois, the station serves the Mattoon, Charleston, and Effingham areas. The station is owned by The Cromwell Radio Group, Inc. of Illinois.

Translators
WMCI programming is also carried on a broadcast translator station to extend or improve the coverage area of the station.

References

External links
Cromwell Radio Website
WMCI's official website

Query the FCC's FM station database for W243AM
Radio-Locator Information on W243AM

MCI (FM)